Dryburgh Abbey Bridge was a cable-stayed footbridge of significant historical interest erected near Dryburgh Abbey, in the Borders of Scotland. It connected the villages of Dryburgh and St. Boswells (part of a ribbon of settlements, including Newtown St. Boswells), across the River Tweed. A crossing had existed here for centuries, originally with a ferry service.

The bridge had been commissioned by David Stewart Erskine, 11th Earl of Buchan, an eccentric Scottish aristocrat who later died in Dryburgh. At the time, the cable-stayed type of bridge was undergoing a period of rapid growth in popularity. The Earl opened the completed bridge on 1 August 1817, but in January 1818 it collapsed. One of the designers Thomas Smith described the collapse due to "high wind increasing to perfect hurricane, it carried off chain bridge, leaving only the fastenings and supports, the work of half a year, demolished in an hour...." After a redesign, a replacement was built, but this too collapsed in 1838, by which time the Earl had been dead for several years.

The 1818 collapse, together with that of a slightly shorter bridge across the Saale River in Germany in 1824, caused the reputation of cable-stayed bridges to decline rapidly, and despite a history dating back to the 17th century, the design was almost completely abandoned for over a century, with suspended-deck suspension bridges gaining favour. Later research in the 1930s, and experience with reconstruction after the Second World War, demonstrated that with sound design, cable-stayed bridges are not without their advantages, and the first modern design, the Strömsund Bridge in Sweden, was completed in 1955.

It was an iron suspended-deck suspension bridge, the longest in the world upon its completion. A third Dryburgh Suspension Bridge was built in 1872 to replace the 1838 loss.

See also
Dryburgh Suspension Bridge
List of places in the Scottish Borders

References

External links
 Tweed bridges
 
 Collapse of the original bridge
 Entry for the 1818 bridge at Bridgemeister.com

 

Bridges across the River Tweed
Bridges in the Scottish Borders
Bridges completed in 1817
Cable-stayed bridges in Scotland
1817 in Scotland
1818 in Scotland
Former bridges in the United Kingdom
Former buildings and structures in Scotland